Leonid Yuryevich Krylov (born 2 February 1980) is a Russian paracanoeist. He won silver in the Kayak 200 m KL3 event at the 2020 Summer Paralympics in Tokyo.

References

External links
 

1980 births
Living people
Russian male canoeists
Paracanoeists of Russia
Paralympic silver medalists for the Russian Paralympic Committee athletes
Paralympic medalists in paracanoe
Paracanoeists at the 2020 Summer Paralympics
Medalists at the 2020 Summer Paralympics
Sportspeople from Moscow